Emsdale Airport  is located  northwest of Emsdale, Ontario, Canada.
It was constructed during the Depression and was part of the Trans-Canada Airway System.

During summer of 1941 the Elementary Flying Training school of the Royal Norwegian Air Force at Little Norway moved from Toronto Island Airport. In May 1942 it relocated to the new location of Little Norway at Muskoka Airport.

References

Registered aerodromes in Ontario